Berit Nøkleby (25 September 1939 – 26 July 2018) was a Norwegian historian.

She was born in Drammen, and is a cand.philol. by education. She has contributed to several books on the German occupation of Norway. She wrote book II and IV of the series Norge i krig I–VIII. Fremmedåk og frihetskamp 1940–1945 (II: Nyordning, 1985, and IV: Holdningskamp, 1986).  She wrote the book Josef Terboven. Hitlers mann i Norge (1992), and she was co-editor of the encyclopaedia Norsk Krigsleksikon 1940–1945 (1995).

She died at the age of 78.

Selected works
Nyordning (1985)
Holdningskamp (1986)
Pass godt på Tirpitz! : norske radioagenter i Secret Intelligence Service 1940-1945 (1988)
Da krigen kom (1989) 
Josef Terboven: Hitlers mann i Norge (1992)
Skutt blir den-- : tysk bruk av dødsstraff i Norge 1940-1945 (1996)
Barn under krigen (2000)
Gestapo: tysk politi i Norge 1940–45 (2003)
Krigsforbrytelser: brudd på krigens lov i Norge 1940–45 (2004)
Politigeneral og hirdsjef Karl A. Marthinsen (2010)

References

1939 births
2018 deaths
Norwegian women historians
Historians of World War II
Norwegian biographers
People from Drammen
20th-century Norwegian historians
21st-century Norwegian historians